Colonel  is a military rank. 

Colonel may also refer to:

Honorific title
 Colonel (U.S. honorary title), an honorary award of merit conferred by some states in the United States of America
 Kentucky Colonel, a civilian honorific title awarded by the Commonwealth of Kentucky used to recognize exemplary action(s) or activities of an individual
 Colonel, customary recognition for a US auctioneer who has completed auctioneer school
 Colonel-in-chief, an honorary title of British and Commonwealth Regiments, often bestowed on members of the Royal Family

People
 Colonel Abrams, American singer, musician, songwriter, dancer, and actor
 Colonel Sanders, American businessman, founder of Kentucky Fried Chicken
 Thierry Geoffroy, French-Danish conceptual and format art artist known as "Colonel"

Other uses
 Colonel (card game), a two-player American card game originally from Mexico
 Colonels Mountain (New Brunswick), a mountain in Canada
 Colonel, a 2000 Rick Shelley science fiction novel
 "Colonel Bogey March", a march written in 1914 by Lieutenant F. J. Ricketts

See also
 Colonel By Drive, scenic parkway in Ottawa, Ontario, Canada
 The Colonel (disambiguation)
 Kernel (disambiguation)
 Coronel (disambiguation)